Eriocnema is a genus of flowering plants belonging to the family Melastomataceae.

Its native range is Southeastern Brazil.

Species:

Eriocnema acaulis 
Eriocnema fulva

References

Melastomataceae
Melastomataceae genera
Taxa named by Charles Victor Naudin
Taxa described in 1844